Route 70 may refer to:

KMB Route 70, a bus route in Hong Kong
London Buses route 70
Melbourne tram route 70

See also
List of highways numbered 70

70